Ram Vichar Ray or Ram Vichar Yadav is an Indian politician. He was elected to the Bihar Legislative Assembly from Sahebganj in the 2015 Member of Bihar Legislative Assembly as a member of the Rashtriya Janata Dal. He was elected in 1990, 1995, 2000 and 2015 from here.

References
 
 Sahebganj Election and Results 2018, Candidate list, Winner, Runner-up, Current MLA and Previous MLAs
 Sahebganj Assembly Election Results 2015, Candidate List, Constituency Map

Bihar MLAs 2015–2020
1954 births
Living people
Rashtriya Janata Dal politicians